Bolshoye Mikhalyovo is a rural locality (a village) in Krasnoplamenskoye Rural Settlement, Alexandrovsky District, Vladimir Oblast, Russia. The population was 5 as of 2010. There is 1 street.

Geography 
Bolshoye Mikhalyovo is located 60 km northwest of Alexandrov (the district's administrative centre) by road. Maloye Mikhalyovo is the nearest rural locality.

References 

Rural localities in Alexandrovsky District, Vladimir Oblast
Pereslavsky Uyezd